Shaka Sola (born 14 March 1977) is a Samoan shot putter and discus thrower who became a popular if surprising star at the 2005 World Championships in Athletics.

Career
At the 2005 World Championships in Athletics, Sola arrived late, having missed his flight from Samoa, and did not reach the games until his specialist event (shot put) had completed. As compensation, he asked to be allowed to compete in the javelin, although he had never previously thrown a javelin.

Sola finished last in the event by a considerable distance, throwing the javelin 41.18 metres, over 17 metres less than the next worst competitor. He was roundly applauded and supported by the other javelin throwers, however, all of whom were aware of the reasons for his participation in that event.

Sola, though not a spectacular javelin thrower, is more than capable in his own sports. He won gold at the 2004 Oceania Athletics Championships in both discus (with a games record of 53.79m) and shot put (17.86m), and represented Samoa in the discus at the 2004 Olympic Games.

In 2005, Sola competed in the South Pacific Mini Games for the first time, winning two medals - one gold and one silver. He first competed in the shot put, throwing 17.74 metres and winning his medal of the games. Sola then competed in the discus and came second place with a throw of 49.33.

Personal bests

Achievements

References

External links
 
Sports reference biography

1977 births
Living people
Samoan male shot putters
Samoan male discus throwers
Athletes (track and field) at the 2004 Summer Olympics
Athletes (track and field) at the 2006 Commonwealth Games
Olympic athletes of Samoa
Commonwealth Games competitors for Samoa
Male hammer throwers